Šumskas is a town in Vilnius District Municipality, in Vilnius County, in southeast Lithuania. According to the 2011 census, the town has a population of 919 people.

References 

Towns in Lithuania
Towns in Vilnius County
Vilnius District Municipality
Vilensky Uyezd
Wilno Voivodeship (1926–1939)